Hilde Hofherr (born 20 April 1930) is an Austrian alpine skier. She competed at the 1956 Winter Olympics and the 1960 Winter Olympics.

References

1930 births
Living people
Austrian female alpine skiers
Olympic alpine skiers of Austria
Alpine skiers at the 1956 Winter Olympics
Alpine skiers at the 1960 Winter Olympics
People from Reutte District
Sportspeople from Tyrol (state)
20th-century Austrian women